The Michigan House of Representatives is the lower house of the Michigan Legislature. There are 110 members, each of whom is elected from constituencies having approximately 77,000 to 91,000 residents, based on population figures from the 2010 U.S. Census. Its composition, powers and duties are established in Article IV of the Michigan Constitution.

Members are elected in even-numbered years and take office at 12 p.m. (EST) on January 1 following the November general election. Concurrently with the Michigan Senate, the House first convenes on the second Wednesday in January, according to the state constitution. Each member is limited to serving three terms of two years. The House meets in the north wing of the Michigan Capitol in Lansing. The Democratic Party currently has a majority in the chamber.

In recent years, the Republican majority in the House has been widely attributed to Republican gerrymandering, implemented by the legislature after the 2010 census. In many legislative elections since then, the Democratic Party has won the popular vote, but nonetheless failed to attain a majority. However, after the passage of Proposal 2, a 2018 ballot initiative, redistricting in the state was instead delegated to a nonpartisan commission, which drew new maps after the 2020 census. Aided by these fairer district lines, in 2022, Democrats won a majority in the House for the first time since 2008.

Qualifications
According to the constitution of Michigan, to be eligible for the office of State Representative a person must be a citizen of the United States, at least 21 years of age, and a registered and qualified elector of the district he or she wishes to represent by the filing deadline.

Title
Members of the Michigan House of Representatives are commonly referred to as representatives. Because this mirrors the terminology used to describe members of Congress, constituents and news media, abiding by the Associated Press guidelines for journalists, often refer to members as state representatives to avoid confusion with their federal counterparts. As elected officials, members of the Michigan House of Representatives also receive the courtesy title of the Honorable (abbreviated to Hon. or Hon'ble) for life.

Composition

Leadership

Majority party

Speaker of the House: Joe Tate of Detroit (D-10)
Speaker pro tempore: Laurie Pohutsky of Livonia (D-19)
Majority Floor Leader: Abraham Aiyash of Hamtramck (D-9)

Minority party

Minority Leader: Matt Hall of Battle Creek (R-42)
Minority Floor Leader: Bryan Posthumus of Cannon Township (R-90)

Members

Officials

Speaker of the House

The 75th and current Speaker of the House of Representatives is the presiding officer of the House and the leader of the majority party. The current Speaker is Jason Wentworth, a third-term Republican from Clare.

The Speaker calls the House to order at the hour to which the House last adjourned, preserves order and decorum in the chamber, recognizes Members to speak, and puts all questions. The Speaker is the chief administrator of the House and is technically the employer of all legislative staff. There is also a Speaker pro tempore and two associate Speakers pro tempore who preside in the absence of the Speaker. The full duties of the Speaker are described in Chapter II of the Rules of the House.

Clerk of the House

The Clerk of the House of Representatives is elected by Members of the House at the beginning of each two-year term. The 33rd and current clerk is Gary L. Randall. Randall also served as clerk from 1999 to 2006. The assistant clerk is Richard J. Brown, who served as clerk from 2007 to 2010. Both Randall and Brown are former Members of the House.

Under the rules of the House, the clerk is the parliamentarian of the House, presides in the absence of the Speaker or any Speaker pro tempore, takes roll at the beginning of each session day and announces whether or not a quorum is present, prepares the official calendar and journal of the House, is responsible for the care and preservation of all bills introduced in the House, and for bills sent from the Senate until they are returned to the Senate.

Sergeant at Arms
The sergeant at arms of the House of Representatives is the chief police officer of the House, appointed by the Speaker. The current chief sergeant at arms is David D. Dickson Jr.

The chief sergeant and the assistant sergeants are empowered as law enforcement officers by statute. The sergeants at arms have authority to serve subpoenas and warrants 
issued by the House or any duly authorized officer or committee, see that all visitors are seated and at no time are standing on the floor or balconies of the House, ensure that reasonable decorum is maintained in the lobby immediately in front of the entrance to the chamber to ensure access for Members and to ensure equal treatment for all citizens.

Committees
Article IV of the Michigan Constitution authorizes each house of the Legislature to "establish the committees necessary for the conduct of its business." The House does much of its work in committees, including the review of bills, executive oversight, and the budget and appropriations process. Members of committees and their chairmen are appointed by the Speaker. Bills are referred to a committee by the Speaker, and the chairman of a committee sets its agenda, including whether or not a bill will be reported to the full House. The Committee on Appropriations divides its work among subcommittees ordinarily structured by state department or major budget area.

There are also four statutory standing committees: Joint Committee on Administrative Rules; House Fiscal Agency Governing Committee; Legislative Council; Michigan Capitol Committee. Currently, it would appear, the House committees meet on a 'year by year' basis. A full list may be accessed here.

Unlike the Senate, the House does not utilize the committee of the whole.

House Fiscal Agency

The House Fiscal Agency is a nonpartisan agency within the House of Representatives which provides nonpartisan expertise to members of the House Appropriations Committee, as well as all other Members of the House. Fiscal analysts review the governor's budget recommendation, review and prepare budget bills, supplemental appropriations, and certain transfer requests, provide fiscal impact statements on legislative proposals, monitor state and national situations that may have budgetary implications, research and analyze fiscal issues, prepare reports and documents to assist legislative deliberations, and prepare special reports at the request of Representatives. The economist analyzes legislation related to tax and lottery issues, respond to Representatives' inquiries regarding state tax revenue, revenue sharing, and other economic issues, monitors state revenue, tracks state, and national economic conditions, and prepares reports on revenue and other economic issues. Legislative analysts prepare concise, nonpartisan summaries and analyses of bills. Summaries, completed prior to committee deliberations, describe how a bill would change current law, including any fiscal impact. Analyses are prepared for bills reported to the full House from committee and include, with the summary information, a description of the problem being addressed, arguments for and against the bill, and positions of interested organizations.

The agency is governed by a six-member board consisting of the chairman and minority vice chairman of the Appropriations Committee, the Speaker of the House and the minority leader, and the majority and minority floor leaders. The governing committee is responsible for HFA oversight, establishment of operating procedures, and appointment of the HFA director. The director is one of three state officials charged with annually forecasting the state's revenues at the Consensus Revenue Estimating Conferences, which are held at least twice each year.

In January 1993, a front-page story in The Detroit News detailed a massive scandal in the House Fiscal Agency. For six years, the agency's imprest account was used to finance credit card payments, vacations, and property tax payments as well as payments to HFA employees and contract workers for non-existent workers. The scandal threatened to collapse the joint leadership agreement between the Democrats and Republicans brought about by a 55-55 partisan split in the House from the 1992 election. It resulted in Representative Dominic J. Jacobetti of Negaunee in the Upper Peninsula, the longest-serving Member in history, losing his position as chairman of the powerful Appropriations Committee; the conviction and imprisonment of HFA Director John Morberg; and the resignation of state representative Stephen Shepich as part of a plea bargain.

Past composition of the House of Representatives

See also

Michigan Senate
2012 Michigan House of Representatives election
2014 Michigan House of Representatives election
2016 Michigan House of Representatives election
2018 Michigan House of Representatives election
2020 Michigan House of Representatives election

External links
Democratic Caucus, Michigan House of Representatives
Republican Caucus, Michigan House of Representatives
Michigan House of Representatives
Voting Records
2010 Census Michigan House District Map
2020 Census Michigan House District Map

References
Notes

References

 
State lower houses in the United States
Lansing, Michigan